The Sheraco  Stakes is an Australian Turf Club Group 3 Thoroughbred horse race for horses three years old and older, fillies and mares, at set weights with penalties, over a distance of 1200 metres. It is held annually at Rosehill Racecourse, Sydney, Australia in September. Total prize money for the race is A$250,000.

History
The race is named in honour of the 1982 Australian Oaks winning filly Sheraco.

Distance
 Prior 2012 – 1100 metres
 2013 onwards -  1200 metres

Grade
Prior to 1999 - Unlisted quality handicap
2000–2012 -  Listed Race
2013 onwards - Group 3

Name
2002–2004 - Winning Edge Presentation Stakes

Venue
 2021 - Kembla Grange Racecourse

Winners

 2022 - Shades Of Rose
 2021 - Entriviere
 2020 - Haut Brion Her
 2019 - Mizzy
 2018 - Invincibella
 2017 - Ravi
 2016 - Heavens Above
 2015 - Catkins
 2014 - Catkins
 2013 - Driefontein
 2012 - More Joyous
 2011 - Gybe
 2010 - More Joyous
 2009 - Madame Pedrille
 †2008 - Hairy
 2008 - Mimi Lebrock
 2006 - At Ease
 2005 - Shannon Bank
 2004 - Covet Thee
 2003 - Oomph
 2002 - Pompeii
 2001 - Nanny Maroon
 2000 - Brief Kiss
 1999 - Monisha
 1998 - Patou

† Race moved in the racing calendar from late summer to early spring in 2008 due to the equine influenza outbreak in 2007

See also
 List of Australian Group races
 Group races

External links 
 Sheraco Stakes (ATC)

References

Horse races in Australia